James R. Payton Jr. (born 1947) is Professor of Patristics and Historical Theology at McMaster Divinity College. He is Emeritus Professor of History at Redeemer University.

Biography
Payton joined the McMaster Divinity College faculty in 2021. He taught at Redeemer University College for 30 years, retiring in 2015. He spent eight years as a pastor before joining the Redeemer community. His classes at Redeemer built especially on Byzantine History, which lasted for more than 1100 years. Payton urged that this empire needs to be studied by western Christians because of the significant Christian influences which in many ways drove Byzantine history. He taught courses on Byzantine history, Eastern Orthodoxy, Eastern European history, Patristics, and Church history. He has done extensive study and has written numerous articles in all these fields.

Payton has written six books. "Light from the Christian East: An Introduction to the Orthodox Tradition" was published by InterVarsity Press in 2007. This won the Word Guild's First Place awards in the Leadership and the Biblical categories. He followed that up with "Getting the Reformation Wrong: Correcting Some Misunderstandings" in 2010 (also from InterVarsity Press). In 2011 his "Irenaeus on the Christian Faith: A Condensation of 'Against Heresies'" was published by Pickwick Publications. His decades-long studies of the church fathers led to the publication of "A Patristic Treasury: Early Church Wisdom for Today" (Ancient Faith Publishing, 2013). This won the Word Guild's First Place award in the Devotional category in 2014. His fifth book, "The Victory of the Cross: Salvation in Eastern Orthodoxy" (InterVarsity Press, 2019), won the Word Guild's First Place award in the Academic book category. His sixth book is "The Unknown Europe: How Eastern Europe Got That Way" (Cascade Books, 2021).

Payton is noted for his  work in fostering intellectual dialogue between the Evangelical and Eastern Orthodox Christians. From 1998 to 2006, Payton served CAREE (Christians Associated for Relationships with Eastern Europe) as executive secretary, and from 2006 to 2011 as president. CAREE was a UN-endorsed NGO that worked in Eastern Europe for over 40 years. He has also served on the Ecumenical and Interfaith Relations Committee of the Christian Reformed Church in North America (2004-2010, 2012–2018). He has been the ecumenical member on the Reformed Church in America's Commission on Christian Unity (2013-2020), and served on its Inter-Religious Task Force (2015-2017). He has been a member of the National Muslim-Christian Liaison Committee of Canada (2006-2021), serving as its Christian co-chair 2008–2011. From 2002 to 2007 he was a member of the Europe Forum of the National Council of Churches of Christ in the USA. Since 1999, he has traveled frequently to Eastern Europe to participate in conferences and to teach. In November 2015, he participated in the Global Christian Forum's Consultation, "Discrimination, Persecution, and Martyrdom: Following Christ Together," held in Tirana, Albania.

Education
James R. Payton Jr. received his B.A. (Religion) and M.A. (Theology) from Bob Jones University.  At Westminster Theological Seminary he completed a Masters in Theology in Church History, along with his Masters of Divinity. He went on to receive his Ph.D. from the University of Waterloo in the Intellectual History of Early Modern Europe.

References

Living people
Bob Jones University alumni
Westminster Theological Seminary alumni
University of Waterloo alumni
American Byzantinists
20th-century American historians
20th-century American male writers
1947 births
Scholars of Byzantine history
American male non-fiction writers